Jasin Alex Goldsmith (born 24 July 1969) is a former New Zealand rugby union player. A utility back, Goldsmith first represented Waikato aged 17 and later also played for Auckland and Bay of Plenty at a provincial level. He was a member of the New Zealand national side, the All Blacks, on their 1988 tour of Australia, playing in eight matches but no internationals.

References

1969 births
Living people
Rugby union players from Tokoroa
New Zealand rugby union players
New Zealand international rugby union players
Māori All Blacks players
Waikato rugby union players
Auckland rugby union players
Bay of Plenty rugby union players
Rugby union wings
Rugby union fullbacks
Rugby union centres
People educated at Forest View High School, Tokoroa